The Bournemouth trolleybus system once served the town of Bournemouth, then in Hampshire, but now in Dorset, England.

By the standards of the various now-defunct trolleybus systems in the United Kingdom, the Bournemouth system was a medium-sized one, with a total of 22 routes, and a maximum fleet of 104 trolleybuses. It was also the second largest trolleybus system in southern England, after the London system.

Notable features

The most notable feature of the Bournemouth system was probably the Christchurch trolleybus turntable, which is said to be one of only five such turntables ever to have been constructed worldwide.  It is now a Grade II listed building. The turntable was manually operated and was in use from 19 June 1936 until the closure of the system.

Also notable was the style of bodywork employed on most of the Bournemouth's trolleybuses. Many featured two staircases and the traditional open rear platform was supplemented with a front passenger exit fitted with folding doors.

Preservation

Several of the former Bournemouth system trolleybuses are now preserved, in their distinctive yellow and maroon livery. Two are at the East Anglia Transport Museum (fleet numbers 282 and 286), and two    Sunbeam MF2B trolleybuses plus one other (fleet numbers 99, 297 and 301) are at The Trolleybus Museum at Sandtoft. One is in private ownership in England. One is in the National Transport Museum of Ireland.

See also

History of Bournemouth
Transport in Bournemouth
List of trolleybus systems in the United Kingdom

References

Notes

Further reading

External links

Bournemouth trolleybus picture gallery
SCT'61 website – photos and descriptions of Bournemouth trolleybuses and early motorbuses
National Trolleybus Archive
British Trolleybus Society, based in Reading
National Trolleybus Association, based in London

History of Bournemouth
Bournemouth
Bournemouth
Transport in Bournemouth